Sylvia Hotel may refer to:
Sylvia Hotel, a historic Vancouver, British Columbia, Canada landmark located on English Bay and beside Stanley Park
"The Sylvia Hotel," a song by the Canadian band Zumpano from their 1996 album Goin' Through Changes
Sylvia Hotel, 1999 album by singer-songwriter Cheryl Wheeler